John Prichard (6 May 1817 – 13 October 1886) was a Welsh architect in the neo-Gothic style.  As diocesan architect of Llandaff, he was involved in the building or restoration of many churches in south Wales.

Personal history
John Prichard was born in Llangan, near Cowbridge, Wales on 6 May 1817, the twelfth son of the rector Richard Prichard, who served as vicar-choral of Llandaff for 35 years. He was descended from the Prichard family of Collenna. John Prichard trained as an architect under Thomas Larkins Walker, and as a result was deeply influenced by the ideas of Augustus Pugin; much of his work was in a neo-Gothic style.

He established a practice in Llandaff, Cardiff, becoming 'Resident Diocesan Architect' in December 1844. Between 1852 and 1863 he was in partnership with John Pollard Seddon.  Many of his major commissions were restoration works, most famously for Llandaff Cathedral (1843–69); Prichard and Seddon worked on the cathedral from the 1840s until 1869, when the south-western tower was completed (to Prichard's own design). Much of their work was destroyed by enemy bombing during the Second World War.

Prichard died, unmarried and childless, at the age of 69, and is buried on the south side of the cathedral.  On Prichard's death, Seddon succeeded him as diocesan architect.

Notable projects
The Prichard Bridge, named after the architect, was built in about 1880 to allow carriages to cross the feeder channel between the River Taff and the Llandaff corn mill. It is a Grade II listed building. The mill was demolished in about 1932 and the stream no longer exists; the lower part of the bridge is buried and no longer visible.

One of the few secular buildings on which Prichard & Seddon worked was Ettington Park, where Prichard's brother Richard was vicar. Prichard also designed Nazareth House, Cardiff, a Catholic almshouse built on land donated by John Crichton-Stuart, 3rd Marquess of Bute.  The chapel of the latter was not Prichard's work; it was added later.

Buildings

Llandaff Cathedral, Llandaff (1843–1869) restoration.
Church of St Swithin, Ganarew (1850)
St Michael's Church, Cwmafan (1851).
Church of the Holy Cross, Cowbridge (1850–1852) restoration.
The Church of St Julius and Aaron, Llanharan (1856–1859) restoration.
St Mary's Church, Aberavon rebuilding
Ettington Park, near Stratford upon Avon (1858–1862) restoration.
Church of St John, Llandenny (1860-5) with John Pollard Seddon
Church of St David, Llanddewi Rhydderch, Monmouthshire (1862–1863) restoration
St Mary's on Chapel Hill, Tintern, Monmouthshire (1863–1868) restoration
St Margaret's Church, Roath (1870) commissioned by the Marquess of Bute
St Crallo, Coychurch (1871) restoration
 St Michael and All Angels, Mitchel Troy (1873-1876) rebuilding commissioned by the 8th Duke of Beaufort
Church of SS. Illtyd, Gwynno & Tyfodwg, Llantrisant (1874) restoration
Nazareth House, Cardiff (1875)
St Catharine's Church, Baglan (1875–1882) restoration
Church of St Thomas a Becket, Monmouth (1876)
St Cadfan's Church, Tywyn (1877) restoration.
 Racquets and Fives Club (now Jackson Hall), Cardiff (1878)
Prichard Bridge, Llandaff (c.1880)
St Mary's Church, Whitchurch, Cardiff (1884)
St Mary's Nolton, Bridgend (completed 1877) build
Elerch Vicarage

References

Bibliography

External links

1817 births
1886 deaths
19th-century Welsh architects
Welsh ecclesiastical architects
Gothic Revival architects
People from Cowbridge